Calcutta Unani Medical College and Hospital is a Unani medical college in Kolkata, West Bengal, India. It was established in 1994 and is the only government-recognized Unani medical college in West Bengal. This college is affiliated with the West Bengal University of Health Sciences. This college is recognized by the Ministry of Ayush, Government of India. It offers BUMS degree course.

References

External links
Official Website

1994 establishments in West Bengal
Educational institutions established in 1994
Hospitals established in 1994
Hospitals in West Bengal
Universities and colleges in Kolkata
Affiliates of West Bengal University of Health Sciences